Ammad parkour (born June 17, 1998, in Quetta, Baluchistan, Pakistan), is a Wushu and Parkour athlete. He won a Gold Medal in Wushu National Games 2014 and obtained Silver Medals twice in Jiu Jitsu National Games Lahore 2015.

Early life 
Ammad finished his Matriculation from Universal Public High School in 2016 and completed his FSC in 2018. When Ammad was 13 years old, he began playing Wushu sport and trained for a year. He won a gold medal in the Nationals of Wushu. After that, he became interested in Parkour sport and demonstrated considerable talent in it. Ammad joined a Parkour team consisting of 12 other boys, showing a strong interest in the sport. 2022 World Games Ammad did his international debut for Parkour.

References 

1998 births
Living people
People from Quetta
Sportspeople from Quetta
Pakistani people of Hazara descent
Hazara sportspeople